Mae Ngon is a tambon (subdistrict) of Fang District, in Chiang Mai Province, Thailand. In 2005 it had a population of 17,715 people. The tambon contains 18 villages.

References

Tambon of Chiang Mai province
Populated places in Chiang Mai province